Nyasha is a Zimbabwean name of Shona origin which refers grace, mercy, or kind-hearted, and it is a unisex name borne by both male and female children. Nyasha can also be a nickname for those bearing names such as Nyashadzashe, Nyashanu.

People with the name 
Nyasha Chari (born 1980), Zimbabwean cricketer
Nyasha Chikwinya, Zimbabwean politician
Nyasha Hatendi (born 1981), American-English actor and producer
Nyasha Mayavo (born 1992), Zimbabwean cricketer
Nyasha Mushekwi (born 1987), Zimbabwean football player
Nyasha Mutsauri (born 1991), Zimbabwean beauty pageant titleholder
Nyasha Ashley Ngarira   (born on 13 November 2000) Zimbabwean handball player and LONG club president
Nyasha David, Zimbabwean music artist 
Nyasha Matonhodze, Zimbabwean-British fashion model
Nyasha Gwanzura, Zimbabwean cricketer
Nyasha Michelle, Zimbabwean-British television personality
Nyasha Chingono, a Zimbawean journalist 
Nyasha Chintuli, a Zimbabwean footballer for Manica Diamonds Football Club 
Nyasha K Mutizwa, a Zimbabwean journalist 
Nyasha Nigel Manyonda, a Zimbabwean born IT and Cybersecurity Specialist

As a surname 
 Kiilu Nyasha (1939–2018), American activist and journalist

Shona given names
Given names
Surnames
Unisex given names
Zimbabwean names